Çaparkayı is a village in the Şabanözü District of Çankırı Province in Turkey. Its population is 204 (2021).

References

Villages in Şabanözü District